Coquitlam-Maillardville is a provincial electoral district for the Legislative Assembly of British Columbia, Canada.

Demographics

Geography 
The Coquitlam–Maillardville district encompasses most of land of the City of Coquitlam except for the city centre, Westwood Plateau, and a small corner in the northwest that belongs to the Port Moody-Coquitlam electoral district. Coquitlam–Mallardville is bounded by North Road, the Brunette River, and Braid Street to the west; the Fraser River to the south; and the Coquitlam River, and Westwood Street and its extension south from Kingsway Avenue to the river, to the east. The north and northwest boundary follows the CPR tracks from Westwood Street to just north of Viewmount Drive. It then goes south along Viewmont and continues straight, to the end of Brookmount Road. From here it goes west along Brookmount Road and Brookmount Avenue, north of Fresno Place, Harbour Drive, and Bent Court to Gatensbury Avenue, then south to Foster Avenue, west to Blue Mountain Street, south to Austin, and west to North Road.

History

Members of the Legislative Assembly

Election results 

|-
 
|NDP
|Diane Thorne
|align="right"|9,818
|align="right"|47.92%
|align="right"|
|align="right"|$70,174
|-

|Independent
|Doug Stead
|align="right"|481
|align="right"|2.35%
|align="right"|
|align="right"|$9,691
|- bgcolor="white"
!align="right" colspan=3|Total Valid Votes
!align="right"|20,484
!align="right"|100%
!align="right"|
|- bgcolor="white"
!align="right" colspan=3|Total Rejected Ballots
!align="right"|137
!align="right"|0.66%
!align="right"|
|- bgcolor="white"
!align="right" colspan=3|Turnout
!align="right"|20,621
!align="right"|55.22%
!align="right"|
|}

|-
 
|NDP
|Diane Thorne
|align="right"|10,532
|align="right"|46.96%
|align="right"|
|align="right"|$48,645
|-

|align="right"|$100
|- bgcolor="white"
!align="right" colspan=3|Total Valid Votes
!align="right"|22,426
!align="right"|100%
!align="right"|
|- bgcolor="white"
!align="right" colspan=3|Total Rejected Ballots
!align="right"|156
!align="right"|0.70%
!align="right"|
|- bgcolor="white"
!align="right" colspan=3|Turnout
!align="right"|22,582
!align="right"|48.87%
!align="right"|
|}

|-

|-
 
|NDP
|Ken Landgraff
|align="right"|4,442
|align="right"|21.90%
|align="right"|
|align="right"|$17,917

|Independent
|Harry Warren
|align="right"|170
|align="right"|0.84%
|align="right"|
|align="right"|$1,245

|Independent
|Doug Stead
|align="right"|144
|align="right"|0.72%
|align="right"|
|align="right"|$200

|}

|-
 
|NDP
|John Cashore
|align="right"|10,812
|align="right"|45.91%
|align="right"|
|align="right"|$39,269

|-

|Natural Law
|Richard Van Schaik
|align="right"|123
|align="right"|0.52%
|align="right"|
|align="right"|$123

|}

|-
 
|NDP
|John Cashore
|align="right"|11,136
|align="right"|47.18%
|align="right"|
|align="right"|$45,717
|-

|Independent
|Marc (Mikael Ballan) A. R. Boyer
|align="right"|117
|align="right"|0.50%
|align="right"|
|align="right"|$790

|}

See also 
Maillardville

References

External links 
BC Stats
Results of 2001 election (pdf)
2001 Expenditures (pdf)
Results of 1996 election
1996 Expenditures
Results of 1991 election
1991 Expenditures
Website of the Legislative Assembly of British Columbia

British Columbia provincial electoral districts
Politics of Coquitlam
Provincial electoral districts in Greater Vancouver and the Fraser Valley